The 2021 MLS SuperDraft was the 22nd edition of the SuperDraft conducted by Major League Soccer. The SuperDraft is held every January prior to the start of the MLS season. The 2020 SuperDraft was the first held exclusively via conference call and web streaming. The Draft was once again held virtually, and began on January 21, 2021 at 2:00 p.m. Eastern Time, and consisted of three rounds (shortened from four rounds in prior years). Compensatory picks were conveyed to teams that received fourth-round picks via trades.

Format
The SuperDraft format has remained constant throughout its history and closely resembles that of the NFL Draft:

Any expansion teams receive the first picks. MLS has announced that Austin FC would begin play as an expansion team in 2021.
Non-playoff clubs receive the next picks in reverse order of prior season finish.
Teams that made the MLS Cup Playoffs are then ordered by which round of the playoffs they are eliminated.
The winners of the MLS Cup are given the last selection, and the losers the penultimate selection.

Player selection

Round 1

Round 2

Round 3

Compensatory picks 
The draft was shortened to three rounds, from four rounds as in prior years. Compensatory picks were awarded to clubs that had acquired fourth round picks via earlier trades.

2021 SuperDraft trades
Round 1

Round 2

Round 3

Compensatory picks

Notable undrafted players

Homegrown players

Players who signed outside of MLS 
This is a list of eligible players who signed in leagues outside of MLS prior to the SuperDraft

Other notable players

Summary

Selections by college athletic conference

Schools with multiple draft selections

References 

Major League Soccer drafts
SuperDraft
MLS SuperDraft